Iridomyrmex discors is a species of ant in the genus Iridomyrmex. Described by Forel in 1920, it is endemic to Australia. The ant is said to be a general predator or scavenger.

References

Iridomyrmex
Hymenoptera of Australia
Insects described in 1902